Anastasia von Kalmanovich (born July 11, 1972) is a Russian actress and music producer.

Biography 
Anastasia von Kalmanovich (née Natalia Brileva) was born in Kėdainiai. Her father Nikolai Petrovich Prilyon died in an airplane crash on December 11, 1988.

Career 
She started her acting career in 2002.

She is an ex-record producer of the group «Tokio» and singer Zemfira.

Personal life 
She has two children, daughter Daniella Kalmanovich (born in 1998, whose father is her first husband, businessman Shabtai Kalmanovich who was killed in 2009) and son Tikhon Fomin (born on February 11, 2010; whose father is her second husband, DJ Fyodr Fomin).

References

External links 
 

1972 births
Living people
People from Kėdainiai
Russian film actresses
Russian television actresses
Russian record producers
Lithuanian people of Russian descent
Russian women record producers